Dean Schofield (born 19 January 1979 in Clayton, Manchester, England) is a former professional Rugby union player who played for London Welsh, among other clubs. He plays lock and is a product of Aldwinians RUFC. He first came to prominence when scoring twice as Aldwinians beat Dudley Kingswinsford in the NPI Cup Final at Twickenham. He also played for Wakefield during their time in National Division One.

Schofield made his England debut in a defeat to South Africa, during a summer tour prior to the 2007 Rugby World Cup.

He was named in the England squad to participate in the 2009 Churchill Cup, coming off the bench in the Final.

In the 2005–2006 season, Schofield played as a replacement in the final as Sale Sharks won their first ever Premiership title. After having played for Sale Sharks since 2001, Schofield was named their captain for the 2009-10 Guinness Premiership season. However, that season being the last in his contract, he chose to leave Sale at the end of the season. On 1 February 2010, he announced that he had signed a two-year deal with Top 14 club Toulon, effective from the 2010–11 Top 14 season.

In April 2012, it was announced that Schofield will be joining Worcester Warriors at the start of the 2012–13 season. He was the club captain of Worcester Warriors. On 27 June 2014, Schofield signed for London Welsh who returned to the Aviva Premiership for the 2014–15 season.

For 2014/15 season, Schofield signed for Yorkshire Carnegie in the Greene King IPA Championship.

Personal life
Schofield lives with his partner Gemma and her son. Gemma is a successful property developer from Cheshire and runs her own company, GB Homes.

References

External links
Sale profile
England profile
Sky Sports profile
RC Toulon Profile

1979 births
Living people
England international rugby union players
English rugby union players
Leeds Tykes players
London Welsh RFC players
People from Clayton
RC Toulonnais players
Rugby union locks
Rugby union players from Manchester
Sale Sharks players
Wakefield RFC players
Worcester Warriors players